Csor may refer to:
Canadian Special Operations Regiment
Connecticut Southern Railroad
Csór, a village in Fejér county, Hungary